Torbjørn Lysaker Heggem (born 12 January 1999) is a Norwegian footballer who plays as a defender for IF Brommapojkarna.

Career
Torbjørn Lysaker Heggem joined Rosenborg in 2014 from Astor. He made his debut for Rosenborg coming on as a substitute against Lillestrøm in the 2018 Mesterfinalen. In January 2019, Heggem was sent out on loan to fellow Trondheim and Eliteserien club Ranheim. Later that year he made his debut in Eliteserien on 19 May, playing the full game which Ranheim won 3-1 away against Sarpsborg 08. In January 2021 he joined Sandnes Ulf.

Career statistics

Club

Honours

Rosenborg
 Mesterfinalen: 2018

References

External links
 Profile at RBK.no

1999 births
Living people
Footballers from Trondheim
Norwegian footballers
Rosenborg BK players
Ranheim Fotball players
Eliteserien players
Association football defenders